Gary Orazio Vincenzo Pillitteri (born 1 March 1936) was a member of the House of Commons of Canada from 1993 to 2004. Born in Racalmuto, Italy, Pillitteri is a farmer and businessman. Currently, he is the founder and president of Pillitteri Estates Winery in Niagara-on-the-Lake.

Pillitteri is a member of the Liberal Party who first bid for the Niagara Falls electoral district in 1988. He lost to Conservative candidate Rob Nicholson in that election by a narrow margin of only 1,940 votes. After a second attempt in the 1993 general election, he defeated Nicholson by 10,823 votes and joined the federal Parliament and was re-elected in 1997 and 2000. He therefore served in the 35th, 36th and 37th Canadian Parliaments.

Pillitteri left federal politics in 2004 and did not seek a fourth term in federal office. Rob Nicholson decided to put his name forward to run as the Conservative candidate in the next election only once he learned that Pillitteri had retired. Nicholson regained the riding that year.

Electoral record

References

External links 
 

1936 births
Living people
Italian emigrants to Canada
Liberal Party of Canada MPs
Members of the House of Commons of Canada from Ontario
People from Niagara-on-the-Lake
21st-century Canadian politicians